The UK Rock & Metal Singles Chart is a record chart which ranks the best-selling rock and heavy metal songs in the United Kingdom. Compiled and published by the Official Charts Company, the data is based on each track's weekly physical sales, digital downloads and streams. In 2001, there were 16 singles that topped the 52 published charts. The first number-one single of the year was "Warning" by American pop punk band Green Day, the second single from the album of the same name, which spent the first two weeks of the year at number one. The final number-one single of the year was "In Too Deep", the second single from Canadian pop punk band Sum 41's debut album All Killer No Filler, which spent the last three weeks of the year (and the first four weeks of 2002) at number one.

The most successful song on the UK Rock & Metal Singles Chart in 2001 was "Butterfly" by Crazy Town, which spent eleven weeks at number one across two different spells. Alien Ant Farm's recording of Michael Jackson's "Smooth Criminal" spent eight weeks at number one, "Rollin'" by Limp Bizkit was number one for a total of seven weeks, and Train's "Drops of Jupiter (Tell Me)" spent five weeks atop the chart. Linkin Park spent four weeks at number one in 2001 with "Papercut", as well as an additional week atop the chart with "In the End". Sum 41's "In Too Deep" was number one for three weeks, while four singles – "Warning" by Green Day, "Jaded" by Aerosmith, "Million Miles Away" by The Offspring and "It's Been Awhile" by Staind – all spent two weeks at number one during the year.

Chart history

See also
2001 in British music
List of UK Rock & Metal Albums Chart number ones of 2001

References

External links
Official UK Rock & Metal Singles Chart Top 40 at the Official Charts Company
The Official UK Top 40 Rock Singles at BBC Radio 1

2001 in British music
United Kingdom Rock and Metal Singles
2001